Ralph Guthrie (13 September 1932 – September 1996) was an English professional footballer who played as a goalkeeper.

Career
Born in Hartlepool, Guthrie began his career in non-league football with Tow Law Town. He moved to Arsenal in December 1952, and made his debut in September 1954. He later played with Hartlepools United, before returning to non-league football with Horden Colliery Welfare.

References

1932 births
1996 deaths
English footballers
Tow Law Town F.C. players
Arsenal F.C. players
Hartlepool United F.C. players
Darlington Town F.C. players
English Football League players
Association football goalkeepers